The Married Women's Property Act 1884 was an Act of the Parliament of the United Kingdom that significantly altered English law regarding the property rights granted to married women, allowing them to own and control their own property, whether acquired before or after marriage, and sue and be sued in their own name.

See also
Feme covert
Married Women's Property Act 1882
Primogeniture

References
 

United Kingdom Acts of Parliament 1884
Women's rights legislation
Property law of the United Kingdom
Women's rights in the United Kingdom
1884 in women's history